Fall on Me may refer to:

 "Fall on Me" (R.E.M. song)
 "Fall on Me" (Andrea Bocelli and Matteo Bocelli song), covered by A Great Big World and Christina Aguilera
 "Fall on Me", 2016 song by Kitten
 "Fall on Me", 1977 song from Amnesia by Pousette-Dart Band
 "Falls on Me" (Fuel song)